A number of ships operated by BC Ferries are not classed. They are either purchased second hand from other operators, are customized vessels with no class assigned by the builders, or are small passenger only vessels owned by sub-contractors.

 MV Centurion VII - Owned and operated by Pacific Western Marine, under the sponsorship of BC Ferries, and out of Western Pacific Marine's French Creek Terminal - 1985, In Service
 MV Cy Peck - 1961, Retired 1966
 MV Dogwood Princess - 1969, Retired 1979
 MV Dogwood Princess II - 1979, Retired 2003
 MV George S. Pearson - 1961, Retired 1966
  - 1964, Retired 2019
 MV Jervis Queen - 1961, Retired 1966
 MV Langdale Queen - 1961, Retired 1976
 MV Mill Bay - 1969, Retired 2011
  - 2004, In Service
  - 2009, In Service
  - 1958, Retired 2020
 MV Pender Queen - 1961, Retired 1980
 MV Queen of Chilliwack - 1991, Retired 2015
  - 1964
 MV Queen of Prince Rupert - 1965, Retired 2009
 MV Queen of the Islands - 1963, Retired 1991
 MV Queen of the North - 1974, Sank 2006
 MV Quillayute - 1961, Retired 1963
  - 1977, In Service
  - 1982, In Service
  - 1964, Retired 2016
 MV Saltspring Queen - 1961, Retired 1996
 MV Sechelt Queen - 1961, Retired 1976
 SS Smokwa - 1961, Retired 1966
MV Stormaway III - Owned and operated by Kona Winds Yacht Charters Limited, but under the sponsorship of and out of the Langdale terminal of BC Ferries - 2003, In Service
MV Stormaway IV - Owned and operated by Kona Winds Yacht Charters Limited, but under the sponsorship of and out of the Langdale terminal of BC Ferries - 2003, In Service
MV Sunshine Coast Queen - 1967, Retired 1976
MV Vesuvius Queen - 1962, Retired 1998

See also
 List of retired BC Ferries ships

External links
 MV Howe Sound Queen
 MV Northern Adventure
 MV Northern Expedition
 North Island Princess
 Quadra Queen II
 MV Queen of Chilliwack
 MV Queen of New Westminster

 
BC Ferries, unclassed
BC Ferries
BC Ferries